The Yorkshire Wildlife Park is a wildlife conservation and rehabilition centre and tourist attraction located in Branton, south-east of Doncaster, South Yorkshire, England. It opened in 2009 on the site of Brockholes Farm, a former riding school and petting zoo, and features 500 animals of 100 species. Yorkshire Wildlife Park is an official member of the British and Irish Association of Zoos and Aquariums (BIAZA) and the European Association of Zoos and Aquaria (EAZA).

History

Cheryl Williams, Neville Williams, John Minion and Stephen Minion purchased the site in 2008 with funding from Lloyds TSB Commercial, private investment, and a Yorkshire Forward grant. The site was renovated over the 20082009 winter, and officially opened by Justin Fletcher, MBE (also known as Mr Tumble from CBeebies) on 4 April 2009.

In February 2010, the park rescued 13 lions from a Romanian zoo and, after their quarantine period, released them into the newly built  Lion Country enclosure.

In 2011, the zoo opened Land of the Tigers, which contains two pools and a waterfall and was created next to a wetland reserve.

The  enclosure is claimed to be the largest leopard enclosure in the world.

In July 2014, the park opened a large enclosure for polar bears, named Project Polar, with the first bear being 500 kg male Victor; a second arrived in March 2015 called Pixel, who is Victor's grandson.

On 15 April 2015, Yorkshire Wildlife Park announced that one of its Amur tigers had given birth to three cubs on 29 March 2015.

The park's popularity surged soon after its opening, starting in 2009 with only 66,000 visitors; it hosted 323,000 in 2011.

Animals and exhibits

The Yorkshire Hive
In 2021, the park opened its new entrance to the east of the zoo. "The Yorkshire Hive", a new entrance area provides a modern entrance to the park. Guest facilities include a larger car park, retail, dining, coffee shops and ticket centre. The Yorkshire Hive is free to enter.

In 2022, the park added a new restaurant, and an overnight hotel, servicing the park and the nearby Doncaster Sheffield Airport.

Atlantic Forest
Another new addition in 2021, the park opened Atlantic Forest in April of that year. The area is themed around the Amazon lowlands and houses several animals from the South American continent, including bush dogs, maned wolf and lowland tapir.

Lion Country
Lion Country was opened in May 2010 to house 13 African lions, which were acquired from Oradea Zoological Garden in Romania in February 2010. The lions had been kept in small enclosures and poor living conditions, and were in poor health as the Romanian zoo could not adequately care for them. As of October 2022, there are five lions in Lion Country: Simba, Carla, Crystal, Julie and Ares.

Lemur Woods
Lemur Woods is a walk-through enclosure with many trees, housing groups of crowned, ring-tailed and red-bellied lemurs. The lemurs can often be seen climbing high in the trees, or sunbathing on the ground. Twice a day, visitors can stand and watch the keepers feed the Lemurs. They get very close – within touching distance – and it's one of the popular areas of the park.

Meerkat Manor
Located close to the old entrance to the park, this small exhibit houses the zoo's meerkats

Into Africa
The centrepiece of the Into Africa zone is African Plains, a large multi-species paddock themed around the African savannah. Species in the enclosure include a bachelor group of giraffes, Kafue lechwe, Grévy's zebra and common eland.

The giraffe group have a separate paddock for the winter months, with regular access to the much larger savannah themed exhibit. The park has three giraffes, Jengo and Palle, both of the Reticulated subspecies and Jambo, of the Rothschild's subspecies.

Opposite is an enclosure for the critically endangered black rhinoceros. Themed around the scrublands of East Africa, the enclosure has space for two rhinos and features several mud wallows and a large, open grassland space.

Land of the Tigers
Land of the Tigers houses two Amur tigers: Sayan and Tschuna. The enclosure features two pools and a waterfall, as well as a 150-metre walkway for visitors. The tigers can often be seen playing together or even climbing trees. Vladamir, a former tiger, who died in 2021, previously bred in 2016 with Tschuna, to have 3 cubs – Harley, Hector and Hope. All three cubs have since moved on to other collections in the UK, France and the United States.

Project Polar
Opened in August 2014, Project Polar houses six male polar bears named Pixel, Nissan, Nobby, Hamish, Indie and Yuma. These are the only polar bears in an English zoo. The largest enclosure is ten acres in size and features two pools, the largest of which is eight metres deep and contains 25.5 million gallons of water. This is one of the largest polar bear enclosures in the world and one of the few zoos to house the species in the UK as of 2020.

In 2021, the Rescue and Rehabilitation Centre was converted into a Project Polar 2. The two-part exhibit houses female Polar Bear Flocke and one of her three cubs, Tala. (The other two cubs from Flocke are Indy and Yuma, who have since moved over to the bachelor paddocks.) The family arrived from Antibes and bring the number of Polar Bears at the park to eight – making YWP the largest holder of the species outside of Canada.

South America Viva
South America Viva is a walk-through enclosure displaying several South American species, including Patagonian mara, white-faced saki, Azara's agouti and capybara. There are also separate enclosures housing six-banded armadillos, Venezuelan red howlers, cotton-top tamarins, giant otters and giant anteaters, which are situated near a South America-themed restaurant called "¡caramba!".

In August 2021, two cotton-top tamarins were born. In early October, a Venezuelan red howler was born, named Pablo.

Baboon Reserve

Opened in Easter 2013, the Baboon Reserve houses a troop of Guinea baboons which came from Edinburgh Zoo.

Leopard Heights
Leopard Heights houses one Amur leopards, named Drake. In 2021, Drake's breeding partner, Freya, moved on to Tayto Park in Ireland, having previously parented a litter of cubs in June 2015. The enclosure is 6,000 square metres in size, features climbing frames up to ten metres tall, and cost £300,000 to build.

Experience Ethiopia
The first part of Yorkshire Wildlife Park's 2020 expansion to open, Hyenas of Harar is home to a breeding clan of Spotted Hyenas. The second part to this expansion, Simien Mountains was also opened in 2020. This precinct is themed around the foothills of Ethiopia and is home to a large troop of geladas.

Himalayan Pass
The third 2020 expansion, Himalayan Pass, has a mountainous theme and includes an exhibit for red pandas and a mixed-species exhibit displaying binturong and a family of smooth-coated otters.

Point Lobos
In May 2021, the park opened the new Point Lobos expansion featuring a family of six California sea lions. The sea lions arrived from ZSL Whipsnade Zoo. The exhibit holds three million litres of water, making it the largest filtered sea lion exhibit in the world. Themed around the titular stretch of Californian coastline, Point Lobos is a two-acre, two-lake reserve with stony beach areas and several small islands. Guests can watch sea lions swimming from raised paths around the lake.

Rehabilitation Centre
The Rehabilitation Centre is an educational facility to educate visitors on the park's global conservation efforts and rescue work focused on animals in poor conditions in other collections. Over the years, the Centre has exhibited several rescued species in a series of large, temporary exhibits. The rehomed species are often held until they can move elsewhere in the park, or until new homes in other zoos are found.

The first residents were four Ussuri brown bears rescued from a zoo in Japan. However, all four were elderly and in poor health upon their arrival and the last died eighteen months after coming to the park. The next resident was a fifth male polar bear, called Rasputin, who arrived in late 2019. Rasputin moved to a zoo in Estonia early in 2021.

After Rasputin's departure, the Rehabilitation Centre was converted into the second Project Polar reserve, to house Flocke and her cubs, who Rasputin had fathered at their previous zoo. Currently, Flocke and her daughter Tala reside in the second reserve.

Other animals
Other notable animals in the park's collection include Bennett's wallabies and swamp wallabies, African wild dogs, Visayan warty pigs, Bactrian camels, okapi, roloway monkeys, kirk's dik-dik and various species of reptiles and invertebrates featured in handling and educational displays.

References

External links

 

2009 establishments in England
Tourist attractions in South Yorkshire
Zoos in England
Zoos established in 2009